The Sarasota Open was a golf tournament on the LPGA Tour from 1952 to 1956. It was played in Sarasota, Florida at the Sarasota Bay Country Club from 1952 to 1954 and at the Bobby Jones Golf Club from 1955 to 1956.

Winners
1956 Betsy Rawls
1955 Betty Jameson
1954 Babe Zaharias
1953 Babe Zaharias
1952 Marlene Hagge

References

Former LPGA Tour events
Golf in Florida
Women's sports in Florida